Piperacillin/tazobactam, sold under the brand name Zosyn among others, is a combination medication containing the antibiotic piperacillin and the β-lactamase inhibitor tazobactam. The combination has activity against many Gram-positive and Gram-negative bacteria including Pseudomonas aeruginosa. It is used to treat pelvic inflammatory disease, intra-abdominal infection, pneumonia, cellulitis, and sepsis. It is given by injection into a vein.

Common adverse effects include headache, trouble sleeping, rash, nausea, constipation, and diarrhea. Serious adverse effects include Clostridium difficile infection and allergic reactions including anaphylaxis. Those who are allergic to other β-lactam are more likely to be allergic to piperacillin/tazobactam. Use in pregnancy or breastfeeding appears to generally be safe. It usually results in bacterial death through blocking their ability to make a cell wall.

Piperacillin/tazobactam was approved for medical use in the United States in 1993. It is on the World Health Organization's List of Essential Medicines. It is available as a generic medication.

Medical uses
Its main uses are in intensive care medicine (pneumonia, peritonitis), some diabetes-related foot infections, and empirical therapy in febrile neutropenia (e.g., after chemotherapy). The drug is administered intravenously every 6 or 8 hr, typically over 3–30 min. It may also be administered by continuous infusion over four hours.  Prolonged infusions are thought to maximize the time that serum concentrations are above the minimum inhibitory concentration (MIC) of the bacteria implicated in infection.

Piperacillin-tazobactam is recommended by the National Institute for Health and Care Excellence as first-line therapy for the treatment of bloodstream infections in neutropenic cancer patients.

For β-lactam antipseudomonal antibiotics, including piperacillin/tazobactam, prolonged intravenous infusion is associated with lower mortality than bolus intravenous infusion in persons with sepsis due to Pseudomonas aeruginosa.

Adverse effects
The most common adverse effect is diarrhea (7–11%). Another adverse effect is inhibition of platelets which is also known as thrombocytopenia.

Contraindications
Zosyn is contraindicated when a patient has hypersensitivity to penicillins, cephalosporins, beta-lactamase inhibitors or any component of the formulation.

Society and culture

Trade names
Apart from Tazocin and Zosyn, the drug is marketed in various countries under other trade names such as Tazovex,Tazact, Biopiper TZ, Brodactam, Piptaz, Maxitaz, Kilbac, Trezora, Du-Tazop, Tazopen, Sytaz, Tazin, and Inzalin TZ.

2017 shortage
Various sources have referred to a shortage of the drug since May 2017, citing various reasons, including an earthquake in China and other issues at the major production facility in 海正 (Hisun); increased demand; withdrawal of funding by a major pharmaceutical company.

References

Combination antibiotics
Penicillins
World Health Organization essential medicines
Wikipedia medicine articles ready to translate